William Edward Johnson (June 28, 1906 – September 18, 1976) served as the 22nd lieutenant governor of Nebraska, from 1939 to 1943 He was a Republican who initially served under Democratic governor Robert Leroy Cochran and governor Dwight Griswold, who was also a Republican. He was born in and died in Omaha.

References 

Lieutenant Governors of Nebraska
Nebraska Republicans
1906 births
1976 deaths